Estreature is the action and change of status involved in converting a surety bond asset forfeiture into a civil action.

See also

 Estreat

References

External links
Bond Estreature Law and Legal Definition

Sureties